Brian Keith Bloom (born June 30, 1970) is an American actor and screenwriter. He co-wrote the screenplay and starred in The A-Team, produced by brothers Tony and Ridley Scott. Bloom is the voice of Captain America in The Avengers: Earth's Mightiest Heroes and multiple subsequent Marvel titles. He is the voice of Varric Tethras in BioWare's Dragon Age franchise, B.J. Blazkowicz in MachineGames' Wolfenstein series, as well as multiple Call of Duty performances including Nick Reyes in Call of Duty: Infinite Warfare, the latter of which he co-wrote. He was also a co-writer of Call of Duty: Modern Warfare. He starred as The Punisher in Avengers Confidential: Black Widow and Punisher.

Life and career
Bloom was raised in Merrick, New York. He is the brother of actor Scott Bloom and musician Mike Bloom. As a child, he made his break in the Sergio Leone film Once Upon a Time in America. From there, he was offered the role of Dusty Donovan in the soap opera As the World Turns, which he played for several years. During that run, Bloom won a Daytime Emmy Award in the category of Outstanding Young Leading Man during the 12th Daytime Emmy Awards show for his performance on the series.

After leaving the soap opera, Bloom starred in several made-for-television films with teen subjects, including Crash Course (1988), Dance 'til Dawn (1988) and Desperate for Love (1989). This opened his appeal to later roles, which would include spots in Melrose Place, 2000 Malibu Road, CSI: Miami, Law & Order: Special Victims Unit, Drive and HBO's Oz. He played the role of fanatical cult leader Jonas Sparrow in the Joss Whedon show Dollhouse. Bloom also starred in a series of 1994 television movies playing Bandit, a part loosely based on the Burt Reynolds role. Bloom continued his working relationship with Joe Carnahan, playing private mercenary antagonist "Pike" in the 2010 movie The A-Team, which Bloom also co-wrote with Carnahan, who directed the 20th Century Fox feature based on the television series.
In 1989 Bloom starred alongside Burt Lancaster in the 1990 mini series Voyage of Terror based on the 1985 Achille Lauro ship hijacking.

Bloom also attended the Sheriff’s Academy and served as a Reserve Deputy with the Orange County Sheriff’s Department from 2001 – 2011. He is a certified self defense expert and a Sifu of a rarefied street lethal modern Self Defense System called “Bojuka”. He has participated in combat seminars and taught use of force techniques to law enforcement, military and private security worldwide.

In 1997, Bloom developed and ran a .com hub known as AnimalWorldNetwork.com. The website was an outpost for pet products, information, video content and celebrity pet lifestyle coverage, selling and shipping fair-trade, organic and holistic pet supplies with both brick and mortar locations and a robust online presence. Bloom sold the domain and business in 2007 for an undisclosed eight-figure deal.

Bloom is well known for his long standing association with the Call of Duty franchise, having performed voice over and motion capture work in a majority of the franchise titles culminating with the role of Captain Nick Reyes in Call of Duty: Infinite Warfare, a first-person shooter video game by Activision. Bloom is both the player character, modeled on his likeness, and the writer of the game's acclaimed narrative, for which he was nominated for 'Outstanding Achievement in Video Game Writing' by the Writers Guild of America.

Filmography

Film

Television

Video games

Accolades

References

External links

1970 births
Living people
American male film actors
American male soap opera actors
American male television actors
American male video game actors
American male voice actors
Daytime Emmy Award for Outstanding Younger Actor in a Drama Series winners
Daytime Emmy Award winners
20th-century American male actors
21st-century American male actors